Australia, officially the Commonwealth of Australia, is a sovereign country comprising the mainland of the Australian continent, the island of Tasmania, and numerous smaller islands. Australia is the oldest, flattest, and driest inhabited continent, with the least fertile soils. It is a megadiverse country, and its size gives it a wide variety of landscapes and climates, with deserts in the centre, tropical rainforests in the north-east, and mountain ranges in the south-east.

The ancestors of Aboriginal Australians began arriving from south-east Asia approximately 65,000 years ago, during the last ice age. Arriving by sea, they settled the continent and had formed approximately 250 distinct language groups by the time of European settlement, maintaining some of the longest known continuing artistic and religious traditions in the world. Australia's written history commenced with the European maritime exploration of Australia. The Dutch navigator Willem Janszoon was the first known European to reach Australia, in 1606. In 1770, the British explorer James Cook mapped and claimed the east coast of Australia for Great Britain, and the First Fleet of British ships arrived at Sydney in 1788 to establish the penal colony of New South Wales. The European population grew in subsequent decades, and by the end of the 1850s gold rush, most of the continent had been explored by European settlers and an additional five self-governing British colonies established. Democratic parliaments were gradually established through the 19th century, culminating with a vote for the federation of the six colonies and foundation of the Commonwealth of Australia on 1 January 1901. Australia has since maintained a stable liberal democratic political system and wealthy market economy.

Politically, Australia is a federal parliamentary constitutional monarchy, comprising six states and ten territories. Australia's population of nearly  million is highly urbanised and heavily concentrated on the eastern seaboard. Canberra is the nation's capital, while its most populous city and financial centre is Sydney. The next four largest cities are Melbourne, Brisbane, Perth, and Adelaide. Australia's demography has been shaped by centuries of immigration: immigrants account for 30% of the country's population, and almost half of Australians have at least one parent born overseas. Australia's abundant natural resources and well-developed international trade relations are crucial to the country's economy, which generates its income from various sources including services, mining exports, banking, manufacturing, agriculture and international education.  

Australia is a highly developed country with a high-income economy. As of 2022, it was the world's fourteenth-largest economy with the ninth-highest per capita income. In 2021, it ranked as fifth-highest Human Development Index. Australia is a regional power, and has the world's thirteenth-highest military expenditure. Australia ranks amongst the highest in the world for quality of life, democracy, health, education, economic freedom, civil liberties, safety, and political rights, with all its major cities faring exceptionally in global comparative livability surveys. It is a member of international groupings including the United Nations; the G20; the OECD; the World Trade Organization; Asia-Pacific Economic Cooperation; the Pacific Islands Forum; the Pacific Community the Commonwealth of Nations; and the defence/security organisations ANZUS, AUKUS, the Five Eyes and the Quadrilateral Security Dialogue. It has been a major non-NATO ally of the United States for many decades.

Etymology 

The name Australia (pronounced  in Australian English) is derived from the Latin  ("southern land"), a name used for a hypothetical continent in the Southern Hemisphere since ancient times. Several sixteenth century cartographers used the word Australia on maps, but not to identify modern Australia. When Europeans first began visiting and mapping Australia in the 17th century, the name  was naturally applied to the new territories.

Until the early 19th century, Australia was best known as New Holland, a name first applied by the Dutch explorer Abel Tasman in 1644 (as ) and subsequently anglicised.  still saw occasional usage, such as in scientific texts. The name Australia was popularised by the explorer Matthew Flinders, who said it was "more agreeable to the ear, and an assimilation to the names of the other great portions of the Earth". The first time that Australia appears to have been officially used was in April 1817, when Governor Lachlan Macquarie acknowledged the receipt of Flinders' charts of Australia from Lord Bathurst. In December 1817, Macquarie recommended to the Colonial Office that it be formally adopted. In 1824, the Admiralty agreed that the continent should be known officially by that name. The first official published use of the new name came with the publication in 1830 of The Australia Directory by the Hydrographic Office.

Colloquial names for Australia include "Oz" and "the Land Down Under" (usually shortened to just "Down Under"). Other epithets include "the Great Southern Land", "the Lucky Country", "the Sunburnt Country", and "the Wide Brown Land". The latter two both derive from Dorothea Mackellar's 1908 poem "My Country".

History

Indigenous peoples 

Indigenous Australians comprise two groups: the Aboriginal peoples of the Australian mainland (and surrounding islands including Tasmania), and the Torres Strait Islanders, who are a distinct Melanesian people. Human habitation of the Australian continent is estimated to have begun 50,000 to 65,000 years ago, with the migration of people by land bridges and short sea crossings from what is now Southeast Asia. It is uncertain how many waves of immigration may have contributed to these ancestors of modern Aboriginal Australians. The Madjedbebe rock shelter in Arnhem Land is recognised as the oldest site showing the presence of humans in Australia. The oldest human remains found are the Lake Mungo remains, which have been dated to around 41,000 years ago.

Aboriginal Australian culture is one of the oldest continuous cultures on Earth. At the time of first European contact, Aboriginal Australians were complex hunter-gatherers with diverse economies and societies and about 250 different language groups. Recent archaeological finds suggest that a population of 750,000 could have been sustained. Aboriginal Australians have an oral culture with spiritual values based on reverence for the land and a belief in the Dreamtime.

The Torres Strait Islander people first settled their islands around 4000 years ago. Culturally and linguistically distinct from mainland Aboriginal peoples, they were seafarers and obtained their livelihood from seasonal horticulture and the resources of their reefs and seas.

European exploration and colonisation 

The northern coasts and waters of Australia were visited sporadically for trade by Makassan fishermen from what is now Indonesia. The first recorded European sighting of the Australian mainland, and the first recorded European landfall on the Australian continent, are attributed to the Dutch. The first ship and crew to chart the Australian coast and meet with Aboriginal people was the Duyfken captained by Dutch navigator, Willem Janszoon. He sighted the coast of Cape York Peninsula in early 1606, and made landfall on 26 February 1606 at the Pennefather River near the modern town of Weipa on Cape York. Later that year, Spanish explorer Luís Vaz de Torres sailed through and navigated the Torres Strait Islands. The Dutch charted the whole of the western and northern coastlines and named the island continent "New Holland" during the 17th century, and although no attempt at settlement was made, a number of shipwrecks left men either stranded or, as in the case of the Batavia in 1629, marooned for mutiny and murder, thus becoming the first Europeans to permanently inhabit the continent. In 1770, Captain James Cook sailed along and mapped the east coast, which he named "New South Wales" and claimed for Great Britain.

Following the loss of its American colonies in 1783, the British Government sent a fleet of ships, the First Fleet, under the command of Captain Arthur Phillip, to establish a new penal colony in New South Wales. A camp was set up and the Union Flag raised at Sydney Cove, Port Jackson, on 26 January 1788, a date which later became Australia's national day. Most early convicts were transported for petty crimes and assigned as labourers or servants to "free settlers" (non-convict immigrants). While the majority of convicts settled into colonial society once emancipated, convict rebellions and uprisings were also staged, but invariably suppressed under martial law. The 1808 Rum Rebellion, the only successful armed takeover of government in Australia, instigated a two-year period of military rule. The following decade, social and economic reforms initiated by Governor Lachlan Macquarie saw New South Wales transition from a penal colony to a civil society.

The indigenous population declined for 150 years following settlement, mainly due to infectious disease. Thousands more died as a result of frontier conflict with settlers.

Colonial expansion 

The British continued to push into other areas of the continent in the early 19th century, initially along the coast. In 1803, a settlement was established in Van Diemen's Land (present-day Tasmania), and in 1813, Gregory Blaxland, William Lawson and William Wentworth crossed the Blue Mountains west of Sydney, opening the interior to European settlement. The British claim extended to the whole Australian continent in 1827 when Major Edmund Lockyer established a settlement on King George Sound (modern-day Albany). The Swan River Colony (present-day Perth) was established in 1829, evolving into the largest Australian colony by area, Western Australia. In accordance with population growth, separate colonies were carved from New South Wales: Tasmania in 1825, South Australia in 1836, New Zealand in 1841, Victoria in 1851, and Queensland in 1859. South Australia was founded as a "free province" — it was never a penal colony. Western Australia was also founded "free" but later accepted transported convicts, the last of which arrived in 1868, decades after transportation had ceased to the other colonies.

In 1823, a Legislative Council nominated by the governor of New South Wales was established, together with a new Supreme Court, thus limiting the powers of colonial governors. Between 1855 and 1890, the six colonies individually gained responsible government, thus becoming elective democracies managing most of their own affairs while remaining part of the British Empire. The Colonial Office in London retained control of some matters, notably foreign affairs and defence.

In the mid-19th century, explorers such as Burke and Wills went further inland to determine its agricultural potential and answer scientific questions. A series of gold rushes beginning in the early 1850s led to an influx of new migrants from China, North America and continental Europe, as well as outbreaks of bushranging and civil unrest; the latter peaked in 1854 when Ballarat miners launched the Eureka Rebellion against gold license fees.

From 1886, Australian colonial governments began introducing policies resulting in the removal of many Aboriginal children from their families and communities (referred to as the Stolen Generations).

Federation to the World Wars 

On 1 January 1901, federation of the colonies was achieved after a decade of planning, constitutional conventions and referendums, resulting in the establishment of the Commonwealth of Australia as a nation and the entering into force of the Australian Constitution.

After the 1907 Imperial Conference, Australia and several other self-governing British settler colonies were given the status of self-governing "dominions" within the British Empire. Australia was one of the founding members of the League of Nations in 1920, and subsequently of the United Nations in 1945. Britain's Statute of Westminster 1931 formally ended most of the constitutional links between Australia and the United Kingdom. Australia adopted it in 1942, but it was backdated to 1939 to confirm the validity of legislation passed by the Australian Parliament during World War II.

The Federal Capital Territory (later renamed the Australian Capital Territory) was formed in 1911 as the location for the future federal capital of Canberra. Melbourne was the temporary seat of government from 1901 to 1927 while Canberra was being constructed. The Northern Territory was transferred from the control of the South Australian government to the federal parliament in 1911. Australia became the colonial ruler of the Territory of Papua (which had initially been annexed by Queensland in 1883) in 1902 and of the Territory of New Guinea (formerly German New Guinea) in 1920. The two were unified as the Territory of Papua and New Guinea in 1949 and gained independence from Australia in 1975.

In 1914, Australia joined the Allies in fighting the First World War, and took part in many of the major battles fought on the Western Front. Of about 416,000 who served, about 60,000 were killed and another 152,000 were wounded. Many Australians regard the defeat of the Australian and New Zealand Army Corps (ANZACs) at Gallipoli in 1915 as the nation's "baptism of fire" — its first major military action, with the anniversary of the landing at Anzac Cove commemorated each year on Anzac Day.

From 1939 to 1945, Australia joined the Allies in fighting the Second World War. Australia's armed forces fought in the Pacific, European and Mediterranean and Middle East theatres. The shock of Britain's defeat in Asia in 1942, followed soon after by the bombing of Darwin and other Japanese attacks on Australian soil, led to a widespread belief in Australia that a Japanese invasion was imminent, and a shift from the United Kingdom to the United States as Australia's principal ally and security partner. Since 1951, Australia has been a formal military ally of the United States, under the ANZUS treaty.

Post-war and contemporary eras 

In the decades following World War II, Australia enjoyed significant increases in living standards, leisure time and suburban development. Using the slogan "populate or perish", the nation encouraged a large wave of immigration from across Europe, with such immigrants referred to as "New Australians".

A member of the Western Bloc during the Cold War, Australia participated in the Korean War and the Malayan Emergency during the 1950s and the Vietnam War from 1962 to 1972. During this time, tensions over communist influence in society led to unsuccessful attempts by the Menzies Government to ban the Communist Party of Australia, and a bitter splitting of the Labor Party in 1955.

As a result of a 1967 referendum, the Federal Government received a mandate to implement policies to benefit Aboriginal people, and all Indigenous Australians were included in the Census. Traditional ownership of land ("native title") was recognised in law for the first time when the High Court of Australia held in Mabo v Queensland (No 2) that the legal doctrine of terra nullius ("land belonging to no one") did not apply to Australia at the time of European settlement.

Following the final abolition of the White Australia policy in 1973, Australia's demography and culture transformed as a result of a large and ongoing wave of non-European immigration, mostly from Asia. The late 20th century also saw an increasing focus on foreign policy ties with other Pacific Rim nations. While the Australia Act 1986 severed the remaining vestigial constitutional ties between Australia and the United Kingdom, a 1999 referendum resulted in 55% of voters rejecting a proposal to abolish the Monarchy of Australia and become a republic.

Following the September 11 attacks on the United States, Australia joined the United States in fighting the Afghanistan War from 2001 to 2021 and the Iraq War from 2003 to 2009. The nation's trade relations also became increasingly oriented towards East Asia in the 21st century, with China becoming the nation's largest trading partner by a large margin.

During the COVID-19 pandemic which commenced in Australia in 2020, several of Australia's largest cities were locked down for extended periods of time, and free movement across state borders was restricted in an attempt to slow the spread of the SARS-CoV-2 virus.

Geography

General characteristics 

Surrounded by the Indian and Pacific oceans, Australia is separated from Asia by the Arafura and Timor seas, with the Coral Sea lying off the Queensland coast, and the Tasman Sea lying between Australia and New Zealand. The world's smallest continent and sixth largest country by total area, Australia—owing to its size and isolation—is often dubbed the "island continent" and is sometimes considered the world's largest island. This exclusive economic zone does not include the Australian Antarctic Territory.

Mainland Australia lies between latitudes 9° and 44° South, and longitudes 112° and 154° East. Australia's size gives it a wide variety of landscapes, with tropical rainforests in the north-east, mountain ranges in the south-east, south-west and east, and desert in the centre. The desert or semi-arid land commonly known as the outback makes up by far the largest portion of land. Australia is the driest inhabited continent; its annual rainfall averaged over continental area is less than 500 mm. The population density is 3.4 inhabitants per square kilometre, although a large proportion of the population lives along the temperate south-eastern coastline.

Mount Augustus, claimed to be the world's largest monolith, is located in Western Australia. At , Mount Kosciuszko is the highest mountain on the Australian mainland.

Eastern Australia is marked by the Great Dividing Range, which runs parallel to the coast of Queensland, New South Wales and much of Victoria. The coastal uplands and a belt of Brigalow grasslands lie between the coast and the mountains, while inland of the dividing range are large areas of grassland and shrubland. These include the western plains of New South Wales, and the Mitchell Grass Downs and Mulga Lands of inland Queensland. The northernmost point of the mainland is the tropical Cape York Peninsula.

The landscapes of the Top End and the Gulf Country—with their tropical climate—include forest, woodland, wetland, grassland, rainforest and desert. At the north-west corner of the continent are the sandstone cliffs and gorges of The Kimberley, and below that the Pilbara. The Victoria Plains tropical savanna lies south of the Kimberley and Arnhem Land savannas, forming a transition between the coastal savannas and the interior deserts. At the heart of the country are the uplands of central Australia. Prominent features of the centre and south include Uluru (also known as Ayers Rock), the famous sandstone monolith, and the inland Simpson, Tirari and Sturt Stony, Gibson, Great Sandy, Tanami, and Great Victoria deserts, with the famous Nullarbor Plain on the southern coast. The Western Australian mulga shrublands lie between the interior deserts and Mediterranean-climate Southwest Australia.

Geology 

Lying on the Indo-Australian Plate, the mainland of Australia is the lowest and most primordial landmass on Earth with a relatively stable geological history. The landmass includes virtually all known rock types and from all geological time periods spanning over 3.8 billion years of the Earth's history. The Pilbara Craton is one of only two pristine Archaean 3.6–2.7 Ga (billion years ago) crusts identified on the Earth.

Having been part of all major supercontinents, the Australian continent began to form after the breakup of Gondwana in the Permian, with the separation of the continental landmass from the African continent and Indian subcontinent. It separated from Antarctica over a prolonged period beginning in the Permian and continuing through to the Cretaceous. When the last glacial period ended in about 10,000 BC, rising sea levels formed Bass Strait, separating Tasmania from the mainland. Then between about 8,000 and 6,500 BC, the lowlands in the north were flooded by the sea, separating New Guinea, the Aru Islands, and the mainland of Australia. The Australian continent is moving toward Eurasia at the rate of 6 to 7 centimetres a year.

The Australian mainland's continental crust, excluding the thinned margins, has an average thickness of 38km, with a range in thickness from 24 km to 59 km. Australia's geology can be divided into several main sections, showcasing that the continent grew from west to east: the Archaean cratonic shields found mostly in the west, Proterozoic fold belts in the centre and Phanerozoic sedimentary basins, metamorphic and igneous rocks in the east.

The Australian mainland and Tasmania are situated in the middle of the tectonic plate and have no active volcanoes, but due to passing over the East Australia hotspot, recent volcanism has occurred during the Holocene, in the Newer Volcanics Province of western Victoria and southeastern South Australia. Volcanism also occurs in the island of New Guinea (considered geologically as part of the Australian continent), and in the Australian external territory of Heard Island and McDonald Islands. Seismic activity in the Australian mainland and Tasmania is also low, with the greatest number of fatalities having occurred in the 1989 Newcastle earthquake.

Climate 

The climate of Australia is significantly influenced by ocean currents, including the Indian Ocean Dipole and the El Niño–Southern Oscillation, which is correlated with periodic drought, and the seasonal tropical low-pressure system that produces cyclones in northern Australia. These factors cause rainfall to vary markedly from year to year. Much of the northern part of the country has a tropical, predominantly summer-rainfall (monsoon). The south-west corner of the country has a Mediterranean climate. The south-east ranges from oceanic (Tasmania and coastal Victoria) to humid subtropical (upper half of New South Wales), with the highlands featuring alpine and subpolar oceanic climates. The interior is arid to semi-arid.

Driven by climate change, average temperatures have risen more than 1°C since 1960. Associated changes in rainfall patterns and climate extremes exacerbate existing issues such as drought and bushfires. 2019 was Australia's warmest recorded year, and the 2019–2020 bushfire season was the country's worst on record. Australia's greenhouse gas emissions per capita are among the highest in the world.

Water restrictions are frequently in place in many regions and cities of Australia in response to chronic shortages due to urban population increases and localised drought. Throughout much of the continent, major flooding regularly follows extended periods of drought, flushing out inland river systems, overflowing dams and inundating large inland flood plains, as occurred throughout Eastern Australia in the early 2010s after the 2000s Australian drought.

Biodiversity 

Although most of Australia is semi-arid or desert, the continent includes a diverse range of habitats from alpine heaths to tropical rainforests. Fungi typify that diversity—an estimated 250,000 species—of which only 5% have been described—occur in Australia. Because of the continent's great age, extremely variable weather patterns, and long-term geographic isolation, much of Australia's biota is unique. About 85% of flowering plants, 84% of mammals, more than 45% of birds, and 89% of in-shore, temperate-zone fish are endemic. Australia has at least 755 species of reptile, more than any other country in the world. Besides Antarctica, Australia is the only continent that developed without feline species. Feral cats may have been introduced in the 17th century by Dutch shipwrecks, and later in the 18th century by European settlers. They are now considered a major factor in the decline and extinction of many vulnerable and endangered native species. Seafaring immigrants from Asia are believed to have brought the dingo to Australia sometime after the end of the last ice age–perhaps 4000 years ago–and Aboriginal people helped disperse them across the continent as pets, contributing to the demise of thylacines on the mainland. Australia is also one of 17 megadiverse countries.

Australian forests are mostly made up of evergreen species, particularly eucalyptus trees in the less arid regions; wattles replace them as the dominant species in drier regions and deserts. Among well-known Australian animals are the monotremes (the platypus and echidna); a host of marsupials, including the kangaroo, koala, and wombat, and birds such as the emu and the kookaburra. Australia is home to many dangerous animals including some of the most venomous snakes in the world. The dingo was introduced by Austronesian people who traded with Indigenous Australians around 3000 BCE. Many animal and plant species became extinct soon after first human settlement, including the Australian megafauna; others have disappeared since European settlement, among them the thylacine.

Many of Australia's ecoregions, and the species within those regions, are threatened by human activities and introduced animal, chromistan, fungal and plant species. All these factors have led to Australia's having the highest mammal extinction rate of any country in the world. The federal Environment Protection and Biodiversity Conservation Act 1999 is the legal framework for the protection of threatened species. Numerous protected areas have been created under the National Strategy for the Conservation of Australia's Biological Diversity to protect and preserve unique ecosystems; 65 wetlands are listed under the Ramsar Convention, and 16 natural World Heritage Sites have been established. Australia was ranked 21st out of 178 countries in the world on the 2018 Environmental Performance Index. There are more than 1,800 animals and plants on Australia's threatened species list, including more than 500 animals.

Paleontologists discovered a fossil site of a prehistoric rainforest in McGraths Flat, in South Australia, that presents evidence that this now arid desert and dry shrubland/grassland was once home to an abundance of life.

Government and politics 

Australia is a federal parliamentary constitutional monarchy. The country has maintained a stable liberal democratic political system under its constitution, which is one of the world's oldest, since Federation in 1901. It is also one of the world's oldest federations, in which power is divided between the federal and state and territorial governments. The Australian system of government combines elements derived from the political systems of the United Kingdom (a fused executive, constitutional monarchy and strong party discipline) and the United States (federalism, a written constitution and strong bicameralism with an elected upper house), along with distinctive indigenous features.

The federal government is separated into three branches:
 Legislature: the bicameral Parliament, comprising the monarch (represented by the governor-general), the Senate, and the House of Representatives;
 Executive: the Federal Executive Council, which in practice gives legal effect to the decisions of the cabinet, comprising the prime minister and other ministers of state appointed by the governor-general on the advice of Parliament;

 Judiciary: the High Court of Australia and other federal courts, whose judges are appointed by the governor-general on advice of Parliament

Charles III reigns as King of Australia and is represented in Australia by the governor-general at the federal level and by the governors at the state level, who by convention act on the advice of his ministers. Thus, in practice the governor-general acts as a legal figurehead for the actions of the prime minister and the Federal Executive Council. The governor-general, however, does have reserve powers which, in some situations, may be exercised outside the prime minister's request. These powers are held by convention and their scope is unclear. The most notable exercise of these powers was the dismissal of the Whitlam Government in the constitutional crisis of 1975.

In the Senate (the upper house), there are 76 senators: twelve each from the states and two each from the mainland territories (the Australian Capital Territory and the Northern Territory). The House of Representatives (the lower house) has 151 members elected from single-member electoral divisions, commonly known as "electorates" or "seats", allocated to states on the basis of population, with each original state guaranteed a minimum of five seats. Elections for both chambers are normally held every three years simultaneously; senators have overlapping six-year terms except for those from the territories, whose terms are not fixed but are tied to the electoral cycle for the lower house; thus only 40 of the 76 places in the Senate are put to each election unless the cycle is interrupted by a double dissolution.

Australia's electoral system uses preferential voting for all lower house elections with the exception of Tasmania and the ACT which, along with the Senate and most state upper houses, combine it with proportional representation in a system known as the single transferable vote. Voting is compulsory for all enrolled citizens 18 years and over in every jurisdiction, as is enrolment. The party with majority support in the House of Representatives forms the government and its leader becomes Prime Minister. In cases where no party has majority support, the Governor-General has the constitutional power to appoint the Prime Minister and, if necessary, dismiss one that has lost the confidence of Parliament. Due to the relatively unique position of Australia operating as a Westminster parliamentary democracy with an elected upper house, the system has sometimes been referred to as having a "Washminster mutation", or as a semi-parliamentary system. 
 
There are two major political groups that usually form government, federally and in the states: the Australian Labor Party and the Coalition, which is a formal grouping of the Liberal Party and its minor partner, the National Party. The Liberal National Party and the Country Liberal Party are merged state branches in Queensland and the Northern Territory that function as separate parties at a federal level. Within Australian political culture, the Coalition is considered centre-right and the Labor Party is considered centre-left. Independent members and several minor parties have achieved representation in Australian parliaments, mostly in upper houses. The Australian Greens are often considered the "third force" in politics, being the third largest party by both vote and membership.

The most recent federal election was held on 21 May 2022 and resulted in the Australian Labor Party, led by Anthony Albanese, being elected to government.

States and territories 

Australia has six states — New South Wales (NSW), Queensland (QLD), South Australia (SA), Tasmania (TAS), Victoria (VIC) and Western Australia (WA) — and three mainland territories—the Australian Capital Territory (ACT), the Northern Territory (NT), and the Jervis Bay Territory (JBT). In most respects, the ACT and NT function as states, except that the Commonwealth Parliament has the power to modify or repeal any legislation passed by the territory parliaments.

Under the constitution, the states essentially have plenary legislative power to legislate on any subject, whereas the Commonwealth (federal) Parliament may legislate only within the subject areas enumerated under section 51. For example, state parliaments have the power to legislate with respect to education, criminal law and state police, health, transport, and local government, but the Commonwealth Parliament does not have any specific power to legislate in these areas. However, Commonwealth laws prevail over state laws to the extent of the inconsistency.

Each state and major mainland territory has its own parliament — unicameral in the Northern Territory, the ACT and Queensland, and bicameral in the other states. The states are sovereign entities, although subject to certain powers of the Commonwealth as defined by the Constitution. The lower houses are known as the Legislative Assembly (the House of Assembly in South Australia and Tasmania); the upper houses are known as the Legislative Council. The head of the government in each state is the Premier and in each territory the Chief Minister. The King is represented in each state by a governor; and in the Northern Territory, the administrator. In the Commonwealth, the King's representative is the governor-general.

The Commonwealth Parliament also directly administers the external territories of Ashmore and Cartier Islands, Christmas Island, the Cocos (Keeling) Islands, the Coral Sea Islands, Heard Island and McDonald Islands, and the claimed region of Australian Antarctic Territory, as well as the internal Jervis Bay Territory, a naval base and sea port for the national capital in land that was formerly part of New South Wales. The external territory of Norfolk Island previously exercised considerable autonomy under the Norfolk Island Act 1979 through its own legislative assembly and an Administrator to represent the monarch. In 2015, the Commonwealth Parliament abolished self-government, integrating Norfolk Island into the Australian tax and welfare systems and replacing its legislative assembly with a council. Macquarie Island is part of Tasmania, and Lord Howe Island of New South Wales.

Foreign relations 

Over recent decades, Australia's foreign relations have been driven by a focus on relationships within the Asia-Pacific region and a continued close association with the United States through the ANZUS pact and its status as a major non-NATO ally of that country.  A regional power, Australia is a member of regional and cultural groupings including the Pacific Islands Forum, the Pacific Community and the Commonwealth of Nations, and is a participant in the ASEAN+6 mechanism and the East Asia Summit.

Australia is a member of several defence, intelligence and security groupings including the Five Eyes intelligence alliance with the United States, United Kingdom, Canada and New Zealand; the ANZUS alliance with the United States and New Zealand; the AUKUS security treaty with the United States and United Kingdom; the Quadrilateral Security Dialogue with the United States, India and Japan; the Five Power Defence Arrangements with New Zealand, the United Kingdom, Malaysia and Singapore; and the Reciprocal Access defence and security agreement with Japan.

Australia has pursued the cause of international trade liberalisation. It led the formation of the Cairns Group and Asia-Pacific Economic Cooperation, and is a member of the Organisation for Economic Co-operation and Development (OECD) and the World Trade Organization (WTO). In recent decades, Australia has entered into the Comprehensive and Progressive Agreement for Trans-Pacific Partnership and the Regional Comprehensive Economic Partnership multilateral free trade agreements as well as bilateral free trade agreements with the United States, China, Japan, South Korea, Indonesia, the United Kingdom and New Zealand.

Australia maintains a deeply integrated relationship with neighbouring New Zealand, with free mobility of citizens between the two countries under the Trans-Tasman Travel Arrangement and free trade under the Closer Economic Relations agreement. The most favourably viewed countries by the Australian people in 2021 include New Zealand, the United Kingdom, Japan, Germany, Taiwan, Thailand, the United States and South Korea. A founding member country of the United Nations, Australia is strongly committed to multilateralism, and maintains an international aid program under which some 60 countries receive assistance. Australia ranked fourth in the Center for Global Development's 2021 Commitment to Development Index.

Military 

Australia's armed forces — the Australian Defence Force (ADF) — comprise the Royal Australian Navy (RAN), the Australian Army and the Royal Australian Air Force (RAAF), in total numbering 81,214 personnel (including 57,982 regulars and 23,232 reservists) . The titular role of Commander-in-Chief is vested in the Governor-General, who appoints a Chief of the Defence Force from one of the armed services on the advice of the government. In a diarchy, the Chief of the Defence Force serves as co-chairman of the Defence Committee, conjointly with the Secretary of Defence, in the command and control of the Australian Defence Organisation.

In the 2016–2017 budget, defence spending comprised 2% of GDP, representing the world's 12th largest defence budget. Australia has been involved in United Nations and regional peacekeeping, disaster relief, as well as armed conflicts from the First World War onwards.

Economy 

Australia's high-income mixed-market economy is rich in natural resources. It is the world's thirteenth-largest by nominal terms, and the 18th-largest by PPP. , it has the second-highest amount of wealth per adult, after Luxembourg;  and has the thirteenth-highest financial assets per capita. Australia has a labour force of some 13.5 million, with an unemploynment rate of 3.5% as of June 2022. According to the Australian Council of Social Service, the poverty rate of Australia exceeds 13.6% of the population, encompassing 3.2 million. It also estimated that there were 774,000 (17.7%) children under the age of 15 living in relative poverty. The Australian dollar is the national currency, which is also shared with three Island states in the Pacific: Kiribati, Nauru, and Tuvalu.

Australian government debt, about $963 billion, exceeds 45.1% of the country's total GDP, and is the world's eighth-highest. Australia had the second-highest level of household debt in the world in 2020, after Switzerland. Its house prices are among the highest in the world, especially in the large urban areas.  The large service sector accounts for about 71.2% of total GDP, followed by the industrial sector (25.3%), while the agriculture sector is by far the smallest, making up only 3.6% of total GDP. Australia is the world's 21st-largest exporter and 24th-largest importer. China is Australia's largest trading partner by a wide margin, accounting for roughly 40% of the country's exports and 17.6% of its imports. Other major export markets include Japan, the United States, and South Korea.

Australia has high levels of competitiveness and economic freedom, and is ranked eighth in the Human Development Index. , it is ranked twelfth in the Index of Economic Freedom and nineteenth in the Global Competitiveness Report. It attracted 9.5 million international tourists in 2019, and was ranked thirteenth among the countries of Asia-Pacific in 2019 for inbound tourism. The 2021 Travel and Tourism Competitiveness Report ranked Australia seventh-highest in the world out of 117 countries. Its international tourism receipts in 2019 amounted to $45.7 billion.

Energy 

In 2003, Australia's energy sources were coal (58.4%), hydropower (19.1%), natural gas (13.5%), liquid/gas fossil fuel-switching plants (5.4%), oil (2.9%), and other renewable resources like wind power, solar energy, and bioenergy (0.7%). During the 21st century, Australia has been trending to generate more energy using renewable resources and less energy using fossil fuels. In 2020, Australia used coal for 62% of all energy (3.6% increase compared to 2013), wind power for 9.9% (9.5% increase), natural gas for 9.9% (3.6% decrease), solar power for 9.9% (9.8% increase), hydropower for 6.4% (12.7% decrease), bioenergy for 1.4% (1.2% increase), and other sources like oil and waste coal mine gas for 0.5%.

In August 2009, Australia's government set a goal to achieve 20% of all energy in the country from renewable sources by 2020. They achieved this goal, as renewable resources accounted for 27.7% of Australia's energy in 2020.

Science and technology 
In 2019, Australia spent A$35.6 billion on research and development, allocating about 1.79% of GDP. A recent study by Accenture for the Tech Council shows that the Australian tech sector combined contributes $167 billion a year to the economy and employs 861,000 people. The country's most recognized and important sector of this type is mining, where Australia continues to have the highest penetration of technologies, especially drones, autonomous and remote-controlled vehicles and mine management software. In addition, the Australian recent startup ecosystem is growing annually at rates of 5.8%, and the Sydney and Melbourne ecosystems are already valued at $25 billion. Australia consistently has ranked high in the Global Innovation Index (GII). In 2021, Australia ranked 25th out of the 132 economies featured in the GII 2021, down from being 22nd in 2019.

With only 0.3% of the world's population, Australia contributed 4.1% of the world's published research in 2020, making it one of the top 10 research contributors in the world. CSIRO, Australia's national science agency, contributes 10% of all research in the country, while the rest is carried out by universities. Its most notable contributions include the invention of atomic absorption spectroscopy, the essential components of Wi-Fi technology, and the development of the first commercially successful polymer banknote.

Australia is a key player in supporting space exploration. Facilities such as the Square Kilometre Array and Australia Telescope Compact Array radio telescopes, telescopes such as the Siding Spring Observatory, and ground stations such as the Canberra Deep Space Communication Complex are of great assistance in deep space exploration missions, primarily by NASA.

Demographics 

Australia has an average population density of  persons per square kilometre of total land area, which makes it one of the most sparsely populated countries in the world. The population is heavily concentrated on the east coast, and in particular in the south-eastern region between South East Queensland to the north-east and Adelaide to the south-west.

Australia is highly urbanised, with 67% of the population living in the Greater Capital City Statistical Areas (metropolitan areas of the state and mainland territorial capital cities) in 2018. Metropolitan areas with more than one million inhabitants are Sydney, Melbourne, Brisbane, Perth and Adelaide.

In common with many other developed countries, Australia is experiencing a demographic shift towards an older population, with more retirees and fewer people of working age. In 2018 the average age of the Australian population was 38.8 years. In 2015, 2.15% of the Australian population lived overseas, one of the lowest proportions worldwide.

Ancestry and immigration 

Between 1788 and the Second World War, the vast majority of settlers and immigrants came from the British Isles (principally England, Ireland and Scotland), although there is significant immigration from China and Germany during the 19th century. In the decades immediately following the Second World War, Australia received a large wave of immigration from across Europe, with many more immigrants arriving from Southern and Eastern Europe than in previous decades. Since the end of the White Australia policy in 1973, Australia has pursued an official policy of multiculturalism, and there has been a large and continuing wave of immigration from across the world, with Asia being the largest source of immigrants in the 21st century.

Today, Australia has the world's eighth-largest immigrant population, with immigrants accounting for 30% of the population, the highest proportion among major Western nations. 160,323 permanent immigrants were admitted to Australia in 2018–2019 (excluding refugees), whilst there was a net population gain of 239,600 people from all permanent and temporary immigration in that year. The majority of immigrants are skilled, but the immigration program includes categories for family members and refugees. In 2020, the largest foreign-born populations were those born in England (3.8%), India (2.8%), Mainland China (2.5%), New Zealand (2.2%), the Philippines (1.2%) and Vietnam (1.1%).

The Australian Bureau of Statistics does not collect data on race, but asks each Australian resident to nominate up to two ancestries each census. These ancestry responses are classified into broad standardised ancestry groups. At the 2021 census, the number of ancestry responses within each standardised group as a proportion of the total population was as follows: 57.2% European (including 46% North-West European and 11.2% Southern and Eastern European), 33.8% Oceanian, 17.4% Asian (including 6.5% Southern and Central Asian, 6.4% North-East Asian, and 4.5% South-East Asian), 3.2% North African and Middle Eastern, 1.4% Peoples of the Americas, and 1.3% Sub-Saharan African. At the 2021 census, the most commonly nominated individual ancestries as a proportion of the total population were: 

At the 2021 census, 3.2% of the Australian population identified as being Indigenous — Aboriginal Australians and Torres Strait Islanders.

Language 

Although Australia has no official language, English is the de facto national language. Australian English is a major variety of the language with a distinctive accent and lexicon, and differs slightly from other varieties of English in grammar and spelling. General Australian serves as the standard dialect.

At the 2021 census, English was the only language spoken in the home for 72% of the population. The next most common languages spoken at home are Mandarin (2.7%), Arabic (1.4%), Vietnamese (1.3%), Cantonese (1.2%) and Punjabi (0.9%). Over 250 Australian Aboriginal languages are thought to have existed at the time of first European contact, of which fewer than twenty are still in daily use by all age groups. About 110 others are spoken exclusively by older people. At the time of the 2006 census, 52,000 Indigenous Australians, representing 12% of the Indigenous population, reported that they spoke an Indigenous language at home. Australia has a sign language known as Auslan, which is the main language of about 10,112 deaf people who reported that they use Auslan language at home in the 2016 census.

Religion 

Australia has no state religion; Section 116 of the Australian Constitution prohibits the federal government from making any law to establish any religion, impose any religious observance, or prohibit the free exercise of any religion.

At the 2021 Census, 38.9% of the population identified as having "no religion", up from 15.5% in 2001. The largest religion is Christianity (43.9% of the population). The largest Christian denominations are the Roman Catholic Church (20% of the population) and the Anglican Church of Australia (9.8%). Multicultural immigration since the Second World War has led to the growth of non-Christian religions, the largest of which are Islam (3.2%), Hinduism (2.7%), Buddhism (2.4%), Sikhism (0.8%), and Judaism (0.4%).

In 2021, just under 8,000 people declared an affiliation with traditional Aboriginal religions. In Australian Aboriginal mythology and the animist framework developed in Aboriginal Australia, the Dreaming is a sacred era in which ancestral totemic spirit beings formed The Creation. The Dreaming established the laws and structures of society and the ceremonies performed to ensure continuity of life and land.

Health 

Australia's life expectancy of 83 years (81 years for males and 85 years for females), is the fifth-highest in the world. It has the highest rates of skin cancer in the world, while cigarette smoking is the largest preventable cause of death and disease, responsible for 7.8% of the total mortality and disease. Ranked second in preventable causes is hypertension at 7.6%, with obesity third at 7.5%. Australia ranked 35th in the world in 2012 for its proportion of obese women and near the top of developed nations for its proportion of obese adults; 63% of its adult population is either overweight or obese.

Australia spent around 9.91% of its total GDP to health care in 2021. It introduced universal health care in 1975. Known as Medicare, it is now nominally funded by an income tax surcharge known as the Medicare levy, currently at 2%. The states manage hospitals and attached outpatient services, while the Commonwealth funds the Pharmaceutical Benefits Scheme (subsidising the costs of medicines) and general practice.

During the COVID-19 pandemic Australia had one of the most restrictive quarantine policies, resulting in one of the lowest death rates worldwide.

Education 

School attendance, or registration for home schooling, is compulsory throughout Australia. Education is the responsibility of the individual states and territories so the rules vary between states, but in general children are required to attend school from the age of about 5 until about 16. In some states (Western Australia, Northern Territory and New South Wales), children aged 16–17 are required to either attend school or participate in vocational training, such as an apprenticeship.

Australia has an adult literacy rate that was estimated to be 99% in 2003. However, a 2011–2012 report for the Australian Bureau of Statistics reported that Tasmania has a literacy and numeracy rate of only 50%.

Australia has 37 government-funded universities and three private universities, as well as a number of other specialist institutions that provide approved courses at the higher education level. The OECD places Australia among the most expensive nations to attend university. There is a state-based system of vocational training, known as TAFE, and many trades conduct apprenticeships for training new tradespeople. About 58% of Australians aged from 25 to 64 have vocational or tertiary qualifications and the tertiary graduation rate of 49% is the highest among OECD countries. 30.9% of Australia's population has attained a higher education qualification, which is among the highest percentages in the world.

Australia has the highest ratio of international students per head of population in the world by a large margin, with 812,000 international students enrolled in the nation's universities and vocational institutions in 2019. Accordingly, in 2019, international students represented on average 26.7% of the student bodies of Australian universities. International education therefore represents one of the country's largest exports and has a pronounced influence on the country's demographics, with a significant proportion of international students remaining in Australia after graduation on various skill and employment visas. Education is Australia's third-largest export, after iron ore and coal, and contributed over $28 billion to the economy in 2016–17.

Culture 

The country is home to a diversity of cultures, a result of its history of immigration. Prior to 1850, Australia was dominated by Indigenous cultures. Since then, Australian culture has primarily been a Western culture, strongly influenced by Anglo-Celtic settlers. Other influences include Australian Aboriginal culture, the traditions brought to the country by waves of immigration from around the world, and the culture of the United States. The cultural divergence and evolution that has occurred over the centuries since European settlement has resulted in a distinctive Australian culture.

Arts 

Australia has over 100,000 Aboriginal rock art sites, and traditional designs, patterns and stories infuse contemporary Indigenous Australian art, "the last great art movement of the 20th century" according to critic Robert Hughes; its exponents include Emily Kame Kngwarreye. Early colonial artists showed a fascination with the unfamiliar land. The impressionistic works of Arthur Streeton, Tom Roberts and other members of the 19th-century Heidelberg School—the first "distinctively Australian" movement in Western art—gave expression to nationalist sentiments in the lead-up to Federation. While the school remained influential into the 1900s, modernists such as Margaret Preston, and, later, Sidney Nolan, explored new artistic trends. The landscape remained central to the work of Aboriginal watercolourist Albert Namatjira, as well as Fred Williams, Brett Whiteley and other post-war artists whose works, eclectic in style yet uniquely Australian, moved between the figurative and the abstract.

Australian literature grew slowly in the decades following European settlement though Indigenous oral traditions, many of which have since been recorded in writing, are much older. In the 19th-century, Henry Lawson and Banjo Paterson captured the experience of the bush using a distinctive Australian vocabulary. Their works are still popular; Paterson's bush poem "Waltzing Matilda" (1895) is regarded as Australia's unofficial national anthem. Miles Franklin is the namesake of Australia's most prestigious literary prize, awarded annually to the best novel about Australian life. Its first recipient, Patrick White, went on to win the Nobel Prize in Literature in 1973. Australian Booker Prize winners include Peter Carey, Thomas Keneally and Richard Flanagan. Australian public intellectuals have also written seminal works in their respective fields, including feminist Germaine Greer and philosopher Peter Singer.

Many of Australia's performing arts companies receive funding through the federal government's Australia Council. There is a symphony orchestra in each state, and a national opera company, Opera Australia, well known for its famous soprano Joan Sutherland. At the beginning of the 20th century, Nellie Melba was one of the world's leading opera singers. Ballet and dance are represented by The Australian Ballet and various state companies. Each state has a publicly funded theatre company.

Media 

The Story of the Kelly Gang (1906), the world's first feature-length narrative film, spurred a boom in Australian cinema during the silent film era. After World War I, Hollywood monopolised the industry, and by the 1960s Australian film production had effectively ceased. With the benefit of government support, the Australian New Wave of the 1970s brought provocative and successful films, many exploring themes of national identity, such as Wake in Fright and Gallipoli, while Crocodile Dundee and the Ozploitation movement's Mad Max series became international blockbusters. In a film market flooded with foreign content, Australian films delivered a 7.7% share of the local box office in 2015. The AACTAs are Australia's premier film and television awards, and notable Academy Award winners from Australia include Geoffrey Rush, Nicole Kidman, Cate Blanchett and Heath Ledger.

Australia has two public broadcasters (the Australian Broadcasting Corporation and the multicultural Special Broadcasting Service), three commercial television networks, several pay-TV services, and numerous public, non-profit television and radio stations. Each major city has at least one daily newspaper, and there are two national daily newspapers, The Australian and The Australian Financial Review. In 2020, Reporters Without Borders placed Australia 25th on a list of 180 countries ranked by press freedom, behind New Zealand (8th) but ahead of the United Kingdom (33rd) and United States (44th). This relatively low ranking is primarily because of the limited diversity of commercial media ownership in Australia; most print media are under the control of News Corporation and Nine Entertainment Co.

Cuisine 

Most Indigenous Australian groups subsisted on a simple hunter-gatherer diet of native fauna and flora, otherwise called bush tucker. The first settlers introduced British and Irish cuisine to the continent. This influence is seen in the enduring popularity of several British dishes such as fish and chips, and in quintessential Australian dishes such as the Australian meat pie, which is related to the British steak pie. Post-war immigration transformed Australian cuisine. For instance, Southern European migrants helped to build a thriving Australian coffee culture which gave rise to Australian coffee drinks such as the flat white, while East Asian migration led to dishes such as the Cantonese-influenced dim sim and Chiko Roll, as well as a distinct Australian Chinese cuisine. Sausage sizzles, pavlovas, lamingtons, meat pies, Vegemite and Anzac biscuits are regarded as iconic Australian foods.

Australia is a leading exporter and consumer of wine. Australian wine is produced mainly in the southern, cooler parts of the country. The nation also ranks highly in beer consumption, with each state and territory hosting numerous breweries. Australia is also known for its cafe and coffee culture in urban centres.

Sport and recreation 

Cricket and football are the predominant sports in Australia during the summer and winter months, respectively. Australia is unique in that it has professional leagues for four football codes. Originating in Melbourne in the 1850s, Australian rules football is the most popular code in all states except New South Wales and Queensland, where rugby league holds sway, followed by rugby union. Soccer, while ranked fourth in popularity and resources, has the highest overall participation rates. Cricket is popular across all borders and has been regarded by many Australians as the national sport. The Australian national cricket team competed against England in the first Test match (1877) and the first One Day International (1971), and against New Zealand in the first Twenty20 International (2004), winning all three games. It has also participated in every edition of the Cricket World Cup, winning the tournament a record five times.

Australia is one of five nations to have participated in every Summer Olympics of the modern era, and has hosted the Games twice: 1956 in Melbourne and 2000 in Sydney. It is also set to host the 2032 Games in Brisbane. Australia has also participated in every Commonwealth Games, hosting the event in 1938, 1962, 1982, 2006 and 2018. As well as being a regular FIFA World Cup participant, Australia has won the OFC Nations Cup four times and the AFC Asian Cup once—the only country to have won championships in two different FIFA confederations.

Other major international events held in Australia include the Australian Open tennis grand slam tournament and the Australian Formula One Grand Prix. The annual Melbourne Cup horse race and the Sydney to Hobart yacht race also attract intense interest. Australia is also notable for water-based sports, such as swimming and surfing. The surf lifesaving movement originated in Australia, and the volunteer lifesaver is one of the country's icons. Snow sports take place primarily in the Australian Alps and Tasmania.

See also 

 Outline of Australia
 Index of Australia-related articles

Notes

References

Bibliography

Further reading 

 Denoon, Donald, et al. (2000). A History of Australia, New Zealand, and the Pacific. Oxford: Blackwell. .
 Goad, Philip and Julie Willis (eds.) (2011). The Encyclopedia of Australian Architecture. Port Melbourne, Victoria: Cambridge University Press. .
 Hughes, Robert (1986). The Fatal Shore: The Epic of Australia's Founding. Knopf. .
 Powell, J.M. (1988). An Historical Geography of Modern Australia: The Restive Fringe. Cambridge: Cambridge University Press. 
 Robinson, G.M., Loughran, R.J., and Tranter, P.J. (2000). Australia and New Zealand: Economy, Society and Environment. London: Arnold; New York: Oxford University Press.  paperback,  hardback.

External links 

 
 
 About Australia from the Department of Foreign Affairs and Trade website
 Governments of Australia website (federal, states and territories)
 Australian Government website
 Australian Bureau of Statistics
 Tourism Australia
 

 
English-speaking countries and territories
States and territories established in 1901
G20 nations
Member states of the United Nations
Member states of the Commonwealth of Nations
Countries in Oceania
Countries in Australasia
Geographical articles missing image alternative text
Transcontinental countries
OECD members